7 Comae Berenices is a single star located 249 light years away in the northern constellation of Coma Berenices. It is a dim star but visible to the naked eye near the Coma Star Cluster with an apparent visual magnitude of 4.93.

This is an evolved giant star with a stellar classification of G8 III–IIIb. At the age of 730 million years it is a red clump giant, which indicates it is on the horizontal branch and is generating energy via helium fusion at its core. The star has 2.4 times the mass of the Sun and has expanded to 10 times the Sun's radius. It is radiating about 63 times the Sun's luminosity from its enlarged photosphere at an effective temperature of 5,023 K.

References

G-type giants
Horizontal-branch stars
Coma Berenices
Durchmusterung objects
Comae Berenices, 07
106714
059847
4667